The Warwick is a historic hotel in the Rittenhouse Square neighborhood of Philadelphia, Pennsylvania.

Originally constructed in 1925 in an English Renaissance style, the building was listed on the National Register of Historic Places in 1978, and on the Philadelphia Register of Historic Places on February 8, 1995. The hotel hosted the 1944 NFL Draft, 1960 NFL Draft and 1961 NFL Draft.

The building has been divided into condominiums and a hotel that has operated as the Radisson Blu Warwick Hotel in the past, but is now an independent hotel, the Warwick Hotel Rittenhouse Square.

References

External links
The Warwick Hotel Rittenhouse Square
The Warwick Condominiums
Listing and photographs at Philadelphia Architects and Buildings

Hotel buildings on the National Register of Historic Places in Philadelphia
Hotel buildings completed in 1925
Rittenhouse Square, Philadelphia
1925 establishments in Pennsylvania
Skyscraper hotels in Philadelphia
Residential skyscrapers in Philadelphia